Émile Lejeune (26 February 1895 – 9 January 1973) was a French racing cyclist. He rode in the 1921 Tour de France.

References

1895 births
1973 deaths
French male cyclists
Place of birth missing